Konrad Faber (born 4 November 1997) is a German professional footballer who plays as a midfielder for Jahn Regensburg.

Career
In summer 2021, he joined Jahn Regensburg and made his debut in the 2. Bundesliga against Darmstadt 98.

References

External links
 

1997 births
Living people
German footballers
Footballers from Baden-Württemberg
Association football midfielders
SC Freiburg II players
SSV Jahn Regensburg players
2. Bundesliga players
Regionalliga players